Alan Edward Davidson (born 1 June 1960) is an Australian former association football player. His father is Australian and his mother is Japanese.

Club career
Davidson made his senior debut in the Victorian State League in 1976 at the age of 15 playing for Altona City SC which had been his junior club. He transferred to South Melbourne in 1978, where he played until the end of the 1984 season, making 155 appearances and scoring 13 goals.
 
He moved to England for the 1984–85 season for Nottingham Forest F.C. and a promising start where he broke into the first team as a right-back was curtailed by illness after suffering a blow to the head and having a seizure during a reserve game on a very cold night which side lined him till the end of the season. He resumed training and played for the first team before suffering a serious back injury which sidelined him for over a year, forcing him into early retirement at the age of 25. He returned home to Melbourne.

He resumed playing in Australia at the end of 1986 for South Melbourne and in 1987 transferred to Melbourne Croatia, making 133 appearances and scoring 10 goals from 1987 to the end of the 1991–92 season and transferred to M-League club Pahang FA in Malaysia during 1992 where he was voted the League's best player, guiding the team to the M-League Championship and Malaysia Cup double. He was the only foreign player ever to be honored and received an AMP awarded by the Sultan of Pahang in 1996.

During 1989 Davidson led the Australia National Futsal Team to the first ever FIFA Futsal World Cup in the Netherlands where he played in all three round one games against Zimbabwe, Italy and United States. Brazil were crowned FIFA Futsal World Champions beating the Netherlands 2-1 in the final.

Near the end of his playing career, he guested for South Melbourne FC for two seasons (1994 and 1995), while with the Malaysian club Pahang FA between (1992 and 1996). His penultimate season (1996–97) he guested with the Collingwood Warriors, and his last season (1997–98) was back with the Melbourne Knights.

He finally retired in 1998 at the age of 38 after three World Cup campaigns, one 1989 FIFA Futsal World Cup and an Olympic Games: 1988 Seoul Olympics, 79 Socceroo appearances, 51 FIFA full A internationals and was number #32 official Socceroo Captain and Socceroo Cap No-292. He was inducted to the Football Federation Australia Football Hall of Famen- in the Hall of Champions category in 2001.

Davidson was appointed the head coach of his former team Pahang in January 1999, however he parted ways with Pahang in April the same year.

In 2006 Former 1974 Socceroo World Cup Coach Rale Rasic named Davidson in his greatest ever Socceroo team.

Davidson also sits on Football Federation Australia A-Leagues Independent Match Review Panel and is one of two of the original three founding members of the current Match Review Panel formed in 2008-09 A-League season.

Davidson's footballing career was honoured on 12 July 2012 at the "Australia's Greatest Ever Footballers Gala" ceremony at the Sydney Convention Center being named in Australia's Best 11 ever "Socceroo Team" of all time. The team selected was - Mark Schwarzer, Lucas Neil, Joe Marston, Craig Moore, Alan Davidson, Johnny Warren, Ned Zelic, Tim Cahill, Ray Baartz, Mark Viduka and Harry Kewell.

Alan has been an honorary playing member of Victoria Police Soccer Club (VPSC) for a number of years (his father was a Victoria Police member), representing the Club at a number of local and National events. In June, 2013, Alan was honoured by accepting the title of Community Patron of VPSC. Alan travelled with VPSC in July, 2013, to Hong Kong, playing for VPSC in a tournament with the Hong Kong Police Force, Hong Kong Celebrity All Stars and Victoria Asian Football Federation. VPSC went through the tournament unbeaten to win the title.

Davidson was honoured by Football Federation Victoria at the Grand Hyatt Melbourne on 14 October 2013 in recognition of outstanding contribution to football in the state of Victoria and inducted to the FFV Hall Of Fame.

On Tuesday 17 December 2013, Davidson was again honoured by Football Federation Australia and selected in the FFA Team of the Decade between 1980 - 1989 at The Crown Towers in Melbourne. The FFA Team of the Decade for the 1980s Terry Greedy, Alan Davidson, Tony Henderson, Charlie Yankos, Graham Jennings, Joe Watson,
Murray Barnes, Oscar Crino, Zarko Odzakov, John Kosmina, Eddie Krncevic.

Wednesday 19 March 2014, Davidson was again honoured by Football Federation Victoria by Awarding him a Life Member of FFV in recognition of his outstanding meritorious service to football in Victoria.

International career
His first Australian representative honours were in 1978–79 during the Under 19 World Youth Cup, qualifiers in New Zealand and Paraguay and made 10 youth appearances.
  
Davidson made his senior debut for Australia on 9 February 1980 at the age of 19 against Czechoslovakia in Melbourne drawing the game 2-2.

Davidson retired as Socceroos #32 official Socceroo Captain and Socceroo Cap No-292 after 79 international caps (51 in official FIFA matches) between 1980 and 1991 with the Australia team, scoring 2 goals in those appearances.

Personal life
His son Jason is also a professional football player, currently playing for the Belgian Pro League club K.A.S. Eupen and the Socceroos.

Honours
South Melbourne
 NSL Championship: 1984
 NSL Cup: 1995–96
 Hellenic Cup: 1984

Nottingham Forest
Saudi Arabia Cup: Winners 1984

Melbourne Knights
  NSL Championship Runners Up: 1990–91, 1991–92
 Ansett Challenge Shield: 1987
 Buffalo Cup: 1987

Pahang FA
 Malaysia Premier League:  1992, 1995
 Malaysia Cup: 1992: Runners Up 1994, 1995
 Malaysia Charity Shield: 1992, 1993 Runners Up 1995
 Malaysia FA Cup: Runners Up 1995

Collingwood Warriors
 NSL Cup: 1996–97

Australia
 OFC Nations Cup: 1980
 Trans-Tasman Cup: Winners 1988, Runners Up 1983, 1987
 Merlion Cup: Winners 1982, 1983
 President's Cup South Korea: Runners Up 1987
 Bicentennial Gold Cup 1988 Runners up

Individual
 Alan Davidson - Field 18 (Albert Park Lake) - 1996
 Ahli Mahkota Pahang Pahang: - 1996
 South Melbourne FC Team of the Century – 2000
 FFA Hall of Champions Inductee – 2001
 South Melbourne FC Hall of Champions: Inductee – 2002
 Greatest Ever Socceroos XI Team - 2012
 Football Federation Victoria Hall Of Fame - 2013
Football Federation Australia Team of the Decade 1980-89 - 2013
Football Federation Victoria Life Member - 2014

References

 http://www.goal.com/en-au/news/4020/australia/2012/07/13/3238568/exclusive-humbled-alan-davidson-hails-greatest-ever-gala
 http://au.fourfourtwo.com/Gallery/308555,greatest-ever-socceroos-xi.aspx/1
 http://greatesteveraustralianfootballer.com/

External links
 Nostalgia Liga Malaysia: Alan Davidson

1960 births
Living people
Australian soccer players
Soccer players from Melbourne
Australian expatriate soccer players
Australian expatriate sportspeople in England
Australia under-20 international soccer players
Australia international soccer players
Olympic soccer players of Australia
National Soccer League (Australia) players
South Melbourne FC players
Nottingham Forest F.C. players
Melbourne Knights FC players
Sri Pahang FC players
Collingwood Warriors S.C. players
Australian soccer coaches
Sri Pahang FC managers
Expatriate footballers in Malaysia
Australian expatriate sportspeople in Malaysia
1980 Oceania Cup players
Footballers at the 1988 Summer Olympics
Australian people of Japanese descent
Association football midfielders
Association football defenders
People from Altona, Victoria
Expatriate footballers in England
English Football League players
Australian expatriate soccer coaches
Expatriate football managers in Malaysia